The 1921 East Tennessee State Normal School football team was an American football team that represented East Tennessee State Normal School—now known as East Tennessee State University (ETSU)—as an independent in the 1921 college football season. They were led by William R. Windes, in his second and final season as head coach. He was assisted by English professor Willis Beeler "Bull" Bible, brother of Dana X. Bible and by fellow teacher A. V. McFee. In the 1921 season, the team was much improved on the playing field against much better competition with only one game against high school competition. The team also played against the Johnson City All-Stars, composed of former high school and college players. Windes finished his coaching tenure at the school with a 7–5 record.

Schedule

References

East Tennessee State Normal
East Tennessee State Buccaneers football seasons
East Tennessee State Normal football